Pukekohe Intermediate School is a New Zealand intermediate school located in the rural community of Pukekohe, Auckland. It primarily receives students from Pukekohe Hill, Pukekohe Valley, Pukekohe East, Puni, Mauku and Patumahoe primary schools.

References

External links
Education Review Office report, 2008

Intermediate schools in Auckland